Foudy is a surname. Notable people with the surname include:

 Jean-Luc Foudy (born 2002), Canadian ice hockey player 
 Julie Foudy (born 1971), American soccer player
 Liam Foudy (born 2000), Canadian ice hockey player
 Sean Foudy (born 1966), Canadian football player